Colegio San Bartolomé La Merced is a private Catholic bilingual and co-educational school located in Bogotá, Colombia. The school is affiliated with the Society of Jesus and is often known as "San Bartolo". The school campus, founded in 1941 by Jesuits, is located in the traditional neighborhood of "La Merced" in downtown Bogotá.

The school is considered one of the most traditional and prestigious schools in the country. The education has been recognized for taking a humanistic and social approach. Since its foundation, the school has been ranked among the top high schools in the nation.  San Bartolo Alumni has reached high job positions in Colombian politics, including former presidents, congressmen, ministers, and ambassadors. Others have become scientists, journalists, academics, artists and entrepreneurs.

History 

In the 1930s the Society of Jesus was facing serious financial challenges due to political pressure from the government about the management of the National School of San Bartolomé, currently called "Mayor de San Bartolomé". The Society of Jesus started the construction of the building for the school at the farm La Merced in 1941.

Until 1997 the school was an all-boys boarding school. The school later entered into a modernization process, turning into a co-educational and bilingual school. 

The school operates under the guidelines and directions of ACODESI (The Association of Jesuit Colleges in Colombia) and the school is run according to the General Education Colombian Act 115 of 1994. The school is a founding member of UNCOLI (The Association of International Schools in Bogotá).

Academics 

The school offers pre-school, preparatory, secondary, and high school education within the same campus. All-year programs provide basic liberal arts education and electives. In addition, the school partner with selective institutions across the world to offer English as a second language (ESL) programs overseas. Previous destinations have included the United States, Canada, England, and New Zealand.

Notable alumni 

 Adolfo Carvajal Quelquejeu, politician 
 Lorenzo García, industrialist
 Enrique Luque Carulla, entrepreneur, former owner of the Colombian supermarket chain, Carulla
 Fernando Londoño Hoyos, former minister of Colombia
 Juan Camilo Restrepo, former minister of Colombia
 Carlos Eduardo Ronderos Torres, former minister of Colombia
 Guillermo Fernández de Soto, former minister of foreign affairs of Colombia
 Anibal Fernández de Soto, former mayor of Bogota
 Augusto Ramirez Ocampo, former mayor of Bogota
 Fernando Panesso Serna, ambassador
 Salomón Hakim, neurosurgeon, professor and researcher
 Rene Van Hissenhoven, geologist
 Crístobal de Araque Ponce de León, perpetual chancellor of Our Lady of the Rosary University
 Rodrigo Losada Lora, political scientist
 Fernando Garavito, journalist
 José Fernando Neira, journalist
 Julio Sánchez Cristo, Colombian radio personality
 Hernán Peláez Restrepo, journalist
 Felipe Zuleta Lleras, journalist
 Gustavo Gómez Córdoba, journalist
 Fernando Hinestrosa Forero, attorney, former justice of Colombian Supreme Court, President Universidad Externado
 Roberto Suárez Franco, attorney
 Rodrigo Noguera Calderón, attorney
 Ernesto Barrera Duque, attorney
 Diego López Medina, professor at Universidad de los Andes, Faculty of Law, judge ad-hoc of the Inter-American Court of Human Rights
 Antonio Barreto, professor at Universidad de los Andes, Faculty of Law
 Aquiles Arrieta, Judge Ad-Hoc Constitutional Court of Colombia
 Nicolás del Castillo Mathieu, historian
 Antonio Abello, former minister of Colombia and governor of Atlantico department
 Jaime Herrera Pontón, physician
 Jaime Pastrana Arango, physician
 Alejandro Martinez, artist
 Nicolás Montero, artist
 Héctor Osuna, architect
 Luis Ernesto Lobo-Guerrero, Professor at University of Groningen (Netherlands)
 Juan Diego Soler, astrophysicist at the Institute d'Astrophysique Spatiale Universite Paris Sud
 Mario Andrés Salazar, Biologist at the Ozcan Laboratory (Boston Children's Hospital, Harvard Medical School)
 Jorge Troncoso, Executive Director Market Access and Economic Affairs at Merck & Co., Inc.

See also
 List of Jesuit educational institutions

References

External links 
 San Bartolomé La Merced School site
 Colombian Association of Jesuit Schools site (ACODESI)
 Internationals Schools Union (UNCOLI)
 Antiqui Societas Iesu Alumni San Bartolomé La Merced (ASIA - Bartolina)
 :es:Colegio San Bartolomé La Merced (Bogotá) (in Spanish)

Schools in Bogotá
Jesuit schools in Colombia
Educational institutions established in 1941
1941 establishments in Colombia